The name Nausithous (Ancient Greek: Ναυσίθοος Nausíthoos) is shared by the following characters in Greek mythology:

Nausithous, the king of the Phaeacians who reigned in the generation before Odysseus washed ashore on their home island of Scherie(The contemporary king at the time of odysseus's arrival was Alcinous). He was the son of the god Poseidon and Periboia, the daughter of the Giant king  Eurymedon. According to Homer, Nausithous led a migration of Phaeacians from Hypereia to the island of Scheria in order to escape the lawless Cyclopes. He is the father of Alcinous and Rhexenor. Alcinous would go on to marry his niece, Rhexenor's daughter Arete. One source relates that Heracles came to Nausithous to get cleansed after the murder of his children; during his stay in the land of the Phaeacians, the hero fell in love with the nymph Melite and conceived a son Hyllus with her.
Nausithous, one of the two sons born to Odysseus by Calypso, the other one being Nausinous. According to Hyginus, Nausithous was a son of Odysseus and Circe; his brother was Telegonus.

Notes

References 

 Apollonius Rhodius, Argonautica translated by Robert Cooper Seaton (1853-1915), R. C. Loeb Classical Library Volume 001. London, William Heinemann Ltd, 1912. Online version at the Topos Text Project.
 Apollonius Rhodius, Argonautica. George W. Mooney. London. Longmans, Green. 1912. Greek text available at the Perseus Digital Library.
 Gaius Julius Hyginus, Fabulae from The Myths of Hyginus translated and edited by Mary Grant. University of Kansas Publications in Humanistic Studies. Online version at the Topos Text Project.
 Hesiod, Theogony from The Homeric Hymns and Homerica with an English Translation by Hugh G. Evelyn-White, Cambridge, MA.,Harvard University Press; London, William Heinemann Ltd. 1914. Online version at the Perseus Digital Library. Greek text available from the same website.
 Homer, The Odyssey with an English Translation by A.T. Murray, PH.D. in two volumes. Cambridge, MA., Harvard University Press; London, William Heinemann, Ltd. 1919. . Online version at the Perseus Digital Library. Greek text available from the same website.

Children of Poseidon
Children of Odysseus
Children of Circe
Demigods in classical mythology
Kings in Greek mythology
Phaeacians in Greek mythology